Para-Yeniseian is a proposed group of languages that is considered to be an extinct sister branch of the Yeniseian languages. Para-Yeniseian contains a few extinct languages.

Languages
Para-Yeniseian
Xiongnu
Hunnic
Huna
Dingling
Jie

References

Yeniseian languages